Edmund Hess (17 February 1843 – 24 December 1903) was a German mathematician who discovered several regular polytopes.

See also
 Schläfli–Hess polychoron
 Hess polytope

References 
 Regular Polytopes, (3rd edition, 1973), Dover edition,  (p. 286)
 Hess E Uber die regulären Polytope höherer Art, Sitzungsber Gesells Beförderung gesammten Naturwiss Marburg, 1885, 31-57

19th-century German mathematicians
20th-century German mathematicians
1843 births
1903 deaths
People from Marburg
University of Marburg alumni